The Dukhin number is a dimensionless quantity that characterizes the contribution of the surface conductivity to various electrokinetic and electroacoustic effects, as well as to electrical conductivity and permittivity of fluid heterogeneous systems. The number was named after Stanislav and Andrei Dukhin.

Overview
It was introduced by Lyklema in “Fundamentals of Interface and Colloid Science”.  A recent IUPAC Technical Report used this term explicitly and detailed several means of measurement in physical systems.

The Dukhin number is a ratio of the surface conductivity  to the fluid bulk electrical conductivity Km multiplied by particle size a:

There is another expression of this number that is valid when the surface conductivity is associated only with ions motion above the slipping plane in the double layer. In this case, the value of the surface conductivity depends on ζ-potential, which leads to the following expression for the Dukhin number for symmetrical electrolyte with equal ions diffusion coefficient:

where the parameter m characterizes the contribution of electro-osmosis into motion of ions within the double layer

 F is Faraday constant
 T is absolute temperature
 R is gas constant
 C is ions concentration in bulk
 z is ion valency
 ζ is electrokinetic potential
 ε0 is vacuum dielectric permittivity
 εm is fluid dielectric permittivity
 η is dynamic viscosity
 D is diffusion coefficient

References

Chemical mixtures
Colloidal chemistry
Condensed matter physics
Soft matter